Bush House is a Grade II listed building at the southern end of Kingsway between Aldwych and the Strand in London. It was conceived as a major new trade centre by American industrialist Irving T. Bush, and commissioned, designed, funded, and constructed under his direction.  The design was approved in 1919, work began in 1925, and was completed in 1935.  Erected in stages, by 1929 Bush House was already declared the "most expensive building in the world".

Now mainly part of the Strand Campus of King's College London, Bush House previously served as the headquarters of the BBC World Service. Broadcasting from Bush House lasted for 70 years, from winter 1941 to summer 2012. The final BBC broadcast from Bush House was the 12noon BST news bulletin on 12 July 2012. The BBC World Service is now housed in Broadcasting House in Portland Place. King's College London has taken over the premises since acquiring the lease in 2015.

The longtime occupation of part of Bush House by HM Revenue and Customs (and its predecessor department the Inland Revenue) ended in March 2021 when it vacated the South-West Wing. This wing will also become a part of King's College London's Strand Campus, ensuring all wings of the building are now occupied by the University.

History
The building was commissioned, designed and originally owned by American individuals and companies. Irving T. Bush gained approval for his plans for the building in 1919, which was conceived as a major new trade centre and designed by American architect Harvey Wiley Corbett. The construction was undertaken by John Mowlem & Co.

Sections of Bush House were completed and opened over a period of 10 years: Centre Block was opened in 1925, North-West Wing in 1928, North-East Wing in 1929, South-East Wing in 1930, and South-West Wing in 1935. The full building complex was completed in 1935.

The building's opening ceremony was performed by Lord Balfour, Lord President of the Council, on 4 July 1925. It included the unveiling of two statues at the entrance made by American artist Malvina Hoffman. The statues symbolise Anglo-American friendship and the building bears the inscription "To the friendship of English speaking peoples". Built from Portland stone, Bush House was in 1929 declared the "most expensive building in the world".

Headquarters of the BBC World Service 
The BBC European Service moved into the South-East Wing of Bush House after bombs damaged Broadcasting House on 8 December 1940 during The Blitz. The move was completed in 1941 and the BBC Overseas Service followed in 1958. The BBC World Service occupied four wings of the building.

In 1944 Bush House suffered external damage from a V-1 flying bomb.

The North-West Wing was formerly occupied by BBC Online until they relocated to the BBC Media Village in 2005, with some studio and office space being retained until 2008. The BBC also moved its World Service to Broadcasting House. The final broadcast from Bush was on 12 July 2012. Bulletins now come from Broadcasting House.

BBC GLR 94.9fm - the Local BBC Radio station for London, moved to Bush House for 24 months in 1999, whilst its Marylebone High Street base was modernised.  GLR used two continuity suites for their programmes: the 'new' Cons 4 and 6. These were 'spare' continuities, but a reduction in the number of networks meant they were rarely used until GLR moved in. Broadcaster Bob Mills humorously complained about having to work in a building called 'BVSH' House.

The BBC's lease expired at the end of 2012.

King's College London campus 
A full refurbishment of Bush House and its adjoining wings was undertaken by John Robertson Architects following the BBC's vacation. Bush House, along with North-East Wing, North-West Wing, South-East Wing and Melbourne House were stripped back to CAT A and fully modernised whilst retaining original period features. The intended use was open plan offices with reception spaces for each of the buildings given an individual identity. The courtyard was to remain as a car park/delivery point. Completion of this work transpired in June 2014 as part of the much-marketed Aldwych Quarter.

On 10 March 2015, King's College London announced it had acquired a 50-year lease for the Aldwych Quarter. as a substantial part of its expansion of its Strand Campus John Robertson Architects undertook the interior fit-out to convert Aldwych Quarter into a fully operational, modern university campus, including installation of a 400 seat auditorium, lecture theatres, seminar rooms, academic offices and a health centre. The courtyard has been converted from car parking to semi-public realm and features a new glass pavilion offering access to the Students' Union and undercroft joining the building's wings together.

Since its foundation on 1 August 2017, the King's Business School has been located inside Bush House. It came forth from the School of Management and Business to form the 9th faculty of the university. To ‘support world class education and research with environments which foster creativity and engagement.’ the central block hosts The Department of Informatics which brings together innovators from the business and technology worlds.

King's College London Students' Union (KCLSU) also occupies Bush House. Its Union Shop opened in The Arcade in September 2017, followed by a series of other student spaces in Spring 2018. KCLSU represents all students at King's, but operates as a charity, independent of the university.

See also

Related buildings:

 Bush Terminal
 Bush Tower

Related persons:

 Marian Spore Bush
 Rufus T. Bush

References

External links 

 "World Service staff bid farewell to iconic Bush House", World Radio and TV, BBC News.
 An album of technical photos of the BBC at Bush House, 1961–2005

BBC offices, studios and buildings
Cultural and educational buildings in London
Office buildings in London
Local mass media in London
Commercial buildings completed in 1925
Grade II listed buildings in the City of Westminster
Aldwych
King's College London
Bush House